Herbert Tampere (1 February 1909 Uniküla, Rannu Parish – 19 January 1975 Rannu) was an Estonian folklorist and musicologist.

From 1927 until 1933, he studied at the University of Tartu. From 1929 until 1945, he worked as an assistant at Estonian Folklore Archives. Since 1945 (with pauses) he taught folk music at the Tallinn Conservatory.

His main field of research was folk music, especially runo songs. In total, he melodized over 2000 folk tunes, and he made over 4000 sound recordings.

Awards:
 1969: Estonian SSR merited artistic personnel

Publications

 1935: Eesti rahvaviiside antoloogia, Eesti Akadeemilise Helikunstnikkude Seltsi Toimetused, Tartu
 1937: Über das Problem des Rhythmus im alten estnischen Volkslied, Acta Ethnologica 2, 1937: 1, pp 65–78
 1938: Valimik eesti rahvatantse. Krüger, Tartu (with R. Põldmäe)

References

1909 births
1975 deaths
Estonian folklorists
Estonian musicologists
Estonian folk-song collectors
University of Tartu alumni
Academic staff of the Estonian Academy of Music and Theatre
People from Kastre Parish
20th-century musicologists